Pöllauberg is a municipality in the district of Hartberg-Fürstenfeld in Styria, Austria.

References

Cities and towns in Hartberg-Fürstenfeld District